The NZR O class consisted of six steam locomotives that operated on New Zealand's national rail network. Ordered from the Baldwin Locomotive Works of Pennsylvania in 1885, three arrived in time to begin work in December 1885, while two more were placed in service in January 1886 and the sixth in February 1886. After almost four decades of service, all six were withdrawn in May 1922. None survived to be preserved, although two engine frames and 5 tenders from O class locomotives are known to exist near Summit on the former Rimutaka Incline.

The Baldwin and Rogers locomotives reflected the styling adopted in the 1870s by American builders with elements from the Renaissance Revival and Neo Baroque architectural styles, and with Islamic e.g. Moorish (from Alhambra) influences. Bold colours and painted decorations were used. Many Baldwin locomotives were in Olive Green ground colour, although the Baldwin N and O classes of the 1880s had Tuscan Red ground colour.

External links
Baldwin Steam Trust statistics on the O class
Plan of an O class locomotive by Derek Brown

References

Citations

Bibliography

 
 
 

O
2-8-0 locomotives
Baldwin locomotives
Scrapped locomotives
Railway locomotives introduced in 1885
3 ft 6 in gauge locomotives of New Zealand